Mount Casey  is a mountain,  high, at the north side of the head of Oakley Glacier,  east-northeast of Mount Monteagle in the Mountaineer Range of Victoria Land. It was mapped by the United States Geological Survey from surveys and from U.S. Navy air photos, 1960–64, and named by the Advisory Committee on Antarctic Names for Lieutenant Denis Casey, U.S. Navy Reserve, Catholic chaplain with the winter party at McMurdo Station, 1967.

References 

Mountains of Victoria Land
Borchgrevink Coast